Aqqyztoghay, also known as Akkiztogay, (Aqqiztoğai, اققيزتوعاي) is a town in Atyrau Region, southwest Kazakhstan.

References

Atyrau Region
Cities and towns in Kazakhstan